Roger Johansen (born 4 February 1973) is a Norwegian ice sledge hockey player. He is a keeper, and plays for Oslo KHK.

He comes from Leirfjord, Nordland.

He took part in the 2010 Winter Paralympics in Vancouver.

Honours
2010
 Bronze at the Paralympics
2009
 Silver at the 2009 World Championships
 Gold at the Malmø Open
2007
Gold at the European Championships
2006
Silver at the Paralympics
2004
Gold at the World Championships
2002
Silver at the Paralympics

References

External links 
 

1973 births
Living people
Norwegian sledge hockey players
Paralympic sledge hockey players of Norway
Paralympic gold medalists for Norway
Paralympic silver medalists for Norway
Paralympic bronze medalists for Norway
Ice sledge hockey players at the 2002 Winter Paralympics
Ice sledge hockey players at the 2006 Winter Paralympics
Ice sledge hockey players at the 2010 Winter Paralympics
Medalists at the 2002 Winter Paralympics
Medalists at the 2006 Winter Paralympics
Medalists at the 2010 Winter Paralympics
Paralympic medalists in sledge hockey